The 1983–84 NBA season was Indiana's eighth season in the NBA and 17th season as a franchise.

Offseason

Draft picks

This table only lists picks through the second round.

Roster

Regular season

Season standings

z - clinched division title
y - clinched division title
x - clinched playoff spot

Record vs. opponents

Game log

Player statistics

Season

Player Statistics Citation:

Awards and records
 Steve Stipanovich, NBA All-Rookie Team 1st Team

Transactions

References

See also
 1983-84 NBA season

Indiana Pacers seasons
Ind
Indiana
Indiana